Will Shipley (born August 29, 2002) is an American college football running back for the Clemson Tigers.

Early life and high school
Shipley grew up in Weddington, North Carolina and attended Weddington High School. Shipley was rated the second-best running back in his class by ESPN and committed to play college football at Clemson during his junior year. Shipley did not play his senior season because it was moved to spring of 2021 due to the COVID-19 pandemic. He finished his high school career 4,173 rushing yards on 503 carries, 1,411 receiving yards on 84 catches, and scored 80 total touchdowns.

College career
Shipley joined the Clemson Tigers in January 2021 as an early enrollee. He was named Clemson's starting running back ahead of the team's game against North Carolina State. Shipley finished the season with 739 yards and 11 touchdowns on 149 carries, 16 receptions for 116 yards, and 14 kickoffs returned for 380 yards.

Shipley entered his sophomore season on the watchlist for the Wuerffel Trophy and the Paul Hornung Award.

References

External links
Clemson Tigers bio

Living people
2002 births
Players of American football from North Carolina
Clemson Tigers football players
People from Weddington, North Carolina